Mahamoud Ali Youssouf (born 2 September 1965) is a Djiboutian diplomat. He has served in the government of Djibouti as Minister of Foreign Affairs since 2005.

Biographies
At the end of his schooling, he obtained his baccalaureate at the Djibouti high school in 1985.

Between 1985 and 1990, he studied foreign languages applied at the Lumière University Lyon 2. During 1988, he studied business management at the University of Liverpool. In 1995, he obtained a management magisterium at Université Laval. He then prepares a thesis at the Université libre de Bruxelles.

Diplomatic career

Youssouf, worked at Djibouti's Ministry of Foreign Affairs and headed its Arab affairs department during the 1990s. He served as Ambassador to Egypt from 1997 to 2001.

Youssouf was appointed as Minister-Delegate for International Cooperation on 4 July 2001. He was subsequently appointed as Minister of Foreign Affairs and International Cooperation on 22 May 2005. In 2006, he visited Japan.

Youssouf served as Chairman of the 129th Ordinary Session of the Council of Foreign Ministers of the Arab League in 2008.

Speaking to The New York Times in 2008, Youssouf said that although Djibouti was a small country, it had a sizable port and hoped to develop its economy along the same lines as Dubai. He highlighted the country's strategic location, which he asserted was better positioned than Dubai.

See also
List of current foreign ministers

References

Living people
Foreign Ministers of Djibouti
Ambassadors of Djibouti to Egypt
Afar people
Université Laval alumni
1965 births